Robert Feke ( 1705 or 1707 1752) was an American portrait painter born in Oyster Bay, Long Island, New York. According to art historian Richard Saunders, "Feke’s impact on the development of Colonial painting was substantial, and his pictures set a new standard by which the work of the next generation of aspiring Colonial artists was judged." In total, about 60 paintings by Feke survive, twelve of which are signed and dated.

Life and career

One of Robert Feke's grandmothers was Elizabeth Fones.

Little is known for certain about his life, particularly his early years. Only one work by Feke, a portrait of a child, is datable before 1741. In that year he moved to Boston, where he painted Isaac Royall and Family (1741), a group portrait which borrows its composition from John Smybert’s The Bermuda Group (1729). Feke's works also show the influence of John Wollaston.

From 1741 until 1750, Feke worked in Boston, Newport, Rhode Island, and Philadelphia, painting wealthy merchants and landowners. The latest record of his activities is August 26, 1751; suggestions by Feke's early biographers that he died in Barbados or Bermuda have not been substantiated.

Feke's paintings are known for their sobriety and uniformity, but also for their rich colours and painterly boldness.

Works
 Benjamin Franklin, Portrait ( 1746) at the Fogg Museum, Harvard University Portrait Collection
 Charles Apthorp, Portrait 1748, oil on canvas, Cleveland Museum of Art American
 Grizzell Eastwick Apthorp, Portrait (Mrs. Charles Apthorp) (1748) at the Fine Arts Museums of San Francisco
 Mrs. John Banister, 1748, oil on canvas, The Detroit Institute of Arts
 William Bowdoin
 John Channing, c. 1747–49, oil on canvas 127 x 102, Museum of Fine Arts, Boston
 Mary Channing (Mrs. John Channing), c. 1747–49, oil on canvas 127 x 102, Museum of Fine Arts, Boston
 Tench Francis, Sr., Portrait at the Metropolitan Museum of Art
 Captain Alexander Graydon,  1746, oil on canvas, National Gallery of Art American Museum of Fine Arts
 Thomas Hopkinson, Portrait  at the Smithsonian Institution
 Ralph Inman
 Isaac Royall and Family, Portrait, 1741, Historical & Special Collections, Harvard Law School Library
  Edward Shippen, Portrait of Chief Justice, at the Philadelphia Museum of Art
 Isaac Winslow, c. 1748, Oil on canvas 127 x 102, Museum of Fine Arts, Boston

Gallery

Notes
 Biography at infoplease.com
 
 Myron, Robert, and Abner Sundell. (1969). Art in America from colonial days through the nineteenth century. London: Crowell-Collier Press.
 National Museum of American Art (U.S.), & Kloss, W. (1985). Treasures from the National Museum of American Art. Washington: National Museum of American Art.

References

External links
 John Singleton Copley in America, a full text exhibition catalog from The Metropolitan Museum of Art, which contains material on Robert Feke (see index)

1700s births
1752 deaths
18th-century American painters
18th-century American male artists
American male painters
People from Oyster Bay (town), New York
Artists from New York (state)
People of the Province of New York
American portrait painters
Winthrop family